Haunted Mansion (formerly Retreat House and originally titled Rest House) is a 2015 Filipino supernatural horror film written and directed by Jun Lana, starring Janella Salvador, Marlo Mortel and Jerome Ponce. It was the debut film of 
Janella Salvador after her successful stint on television. It was an official entry to the 41st Metro Manila Film Festival. It was released on December 25, 2015.

The film follows a group of high school kids who are spending the night in a retreat house. When they learn that the retreat house is haunted, they set out to look for the ghosts just for fun, but find out soon enough that the urban legends are real. The film received generally positive reviews from film critics praising its cinematography, visual effects, production design and musical score. The film's cast was also praised for their performances.

Plot

After a student retreat, a young student was alarmed by the agonizing screams of his teacher. He investigates it and goes inside a big mansion where he sees visions of a man burned to death and a woman in black before stumbling across a dead body, which he realizes to his horror is his teacher.

Best friends Ella (Janella Salvador) and Faye (Sharlene San Pedro) are students of a prestigious school. One of their friends and classmates, Adrian (Marlo Mortel), harbors romantic feelings for Ella, who is also skilled with mediumship. Ella confesses to the two that she will not be able to attend their school retreat due to financial problems. Adrian offers to pay for her registration but Ella kindly declines. After a physical education class, Ella sees a ghost of a girl (Andrea Bersamin) in the gymnasium's locker room before being made fun off by three clique students; Megan (Ingrid dela Paz), Jessie (Eliza Pineda) and Allison (Devon Seron). The next day, during a Chemistry class, Jacob (Jerome Ponce), who also harbors feelings for Ella despite being Megan's desire, was asked by the clique give Ella a box of chocolates which actually contains cockroaches unbeknownst to Jacob and Ella. Jacob becomes angry with the clique while friends Steve (Paolo Gumabao), and Jack (Phytos Ramirez), who has a relationship with Jessie, laughed at the prank.

At home, Ella's mother (Lilet), notices Ella's sad behavior and gives her money to join the retreat, which Ella reluctantly accepts. On the day of the retreat, the class was accompanied by their teachers Ms. Gonzalez (Janice De Belen) and Ms. Taas (Sue Prado) and the school's chaplain Father Anthony (Dominic Ochoa) to a mansion on the province. They are greeted by caretakers Selya (Vangie Labalan) and Anding (Archie Adamos). Selya explains to everyone of the mansion's history and was owned by a rich woman named Donya Amara (Iza Calzado), who lived and died during the Japanese Occupation Period and the estate is under the ownership of her descendants who live in the United States. On the first night, while Ella was sleeping, she had a vision about a woman in black committing suicide by hanging herself. 

On the next day during an activity, Ella asked Manang Selya about the woman in the photo, whom she recognized was the woman in black in her dream. Selya explained that she was Veronica (LJ Reyes), Amara's younger sister who committed suicide because of shame from being raped by the mansion gardener Jaime (Joem Bascon). Jaime was then burned to death by people close to the family. That night, Ella, Faye and Adrian were terrorized by whom they thought was a ghost, only for them to find out that it was another prank pulled by Megan and her clique. The noises awaken Jacob, who then attempts to settle things down. Adrian however rebuffed his concerns and blamed him to be a part of the prank while also, revealing that he overheard a conversation between Steve, Jack and Jacob that Jacob only "likes" Ella to make Megan jealous. The argument ensues into a violent fight which was stopped by an angry Ms. Gonzalez and Ms. Taas. As their punishment, the group was not allowed to attend the remaining activities in the retreat and instead serve detention by cleaning the whole vicinity. 

The next night, Ella was haunted by the ghost of Jaime and ended up fainting in fright. Thinking it was another prank pulled by Megan, Ms. Gonzalez and the others made the group stay for another day in the mansion to work out their differences while their classmates and Ms. Taas went home ahead as a huge storm was on its way. Ella then confessed to Adrian that she has the ability to see ghosts and when she was younger, caused her father to be killed, to which she blamed herself for. That night, while Ms. Gonzalez, Father Anthony and the caretakers were asleep, Megan, Jessie, Allison, Jack and Steve decided to hunt ghosts, Jacob, Ella, Adrian and Faye warned them not to but they continued. They decided to leave Megan's cellphone plugged in a battery pack in the confessional in hopes that they will record The Black Lady's (Veronica) voice. 

A storm hits the town and causes a power outage the next morning while water begins to flood the mansion. That night, Steve remembered Megan's phone and asked if she has already retrieved it. He goes to get it alone while the others were fixing candles and putting buckets in leaking areas. Father Anthony noticed Allison, Steve and Jack's disappearance and Jessie volunteered to look for them. A chandelier suddenly dropped on the floor and injured Father Anthony's legs rendering him immobile. On the confessional, Steve retrieves Megan's phone and decided to listen if there were voices recorded. He listened to the recording and was frightened when Jaime's ghost appeared pointing at something. He tried to escape but was caught by another violent ghost. His tongue was then severed and he was killed. Jessie found Jack who was revealed to be cheating on her with Allison. Jessie runs away but stumbles into Steve's dead body, which they carry back to the house. They find Megan's phone in his pocket which Mrs. Gonzalez uses to call for help. Faye and Jacob accompanied her. While making the call, Ms. Gonzalez accidentally listened to Veronica's voice recording and Jaime appeared pointing at something. Ms. Gonzalez suffered from an asthma attack and orders Jacob to grab her inhaler. Faye stays with Ms. Gonzalez and decides to listen to the voice recording as well. Jaime appeared once again pointing at something. Suddenly, the ghost who killed Steve appeared and threw Faye and Ms. Gonzalez to a wall injuring them severely. Ella and the others hear their screams and when they ran to help them, they find their corpses with their tongues ripped out. Jacob told everybody that he saw Ms. Gonzalez freaking out over something she heard from the phone. Father Anthony advises them to listen to the recorded message as they might learn something about the killings. 

The recording turns out to be Veronica's confession, stating that she committed suicide not because Jaime raped her but that they fell in love. Veronica adds that Amara, a witchcraft practitioner, did not approve of their relationship as she had feelings for Jaime also. Due to her practice of sorcery, Amara influenced everyone to believe that Jaime raped her sister and burn him alive. This led to Veronica committing suicide as she lost the love of her life. Eventually, Amara died too.

Ella then realizes that Amara was the real killer. She also discovers that whoever heard Veronica's confession will be killed by Amara because she did not want anybody to know the truth while Megan concludes that everyone would suffer the same fate. Suddenly Jaime's ghost appeared and pointed at Amara's ghost approaching them. Ella, Adrian and Jacob carries Father Anthony to safety. Megan, Jack, Jessie and Allison flee the mansion. Selya and Anding are then killed by Amara, who blasts them through a glass door. Father Anthony asked the three to leave him behind stating that the Lord is with him no matter what. The surviving trio reluctantly leave him and Amara kills Father Anthony. 

Megan and the others cross a flooded area outside the mansion wherein Allison is pulled down by a supernatural force. Jack and Jessie, who noticed her disappearance, are also pulled down and killed before they can warn Megan. Megan now alone encounters Amara surfacing up from the water feasting on the tongues of her three friends. Attempting to get to safety, Megan is captured by the spirit. As the three remaining friends hide, Adrian convinces Ella to use her abilities to ask help from Veronica and Jaime. Ella is drawn to a vision of the afterlife and is greeted by Veronica and Jaime; the former instructing her to destroy Amara's corpse before she takes human form. The trio head to a private tomb in the back area of the house to exhume Amara's corpse. Before Jacob could destroy the corpse, Amara appeared and captured him. A heavily injured Jacob asks Ella and Adrian to leave him before being killed by Amara. While on the run, Adrian is pulled down to the ground by the rotting hands of Amara, also killing him, leaving Ella all alone. She runs to the chapel wherein Amara's ghost confronts her. Using a crucifix, Ella stabs Amara in the mouth and takes out the latter's tongue. Ella is then blasted by the force backwards, injuring her head.

Sometime later, Ella was then seen with her mom and was greeted by her younger siblings. It turned out that Ella suffered from amnesia caused by the head injury as she did not recognize them at all. Ella's mother told her not to worry as her memory will be back some time. Three months later, Ella woke up in her home to find out that her memory has returned. A door opens by itself and Ella, suspecting it was her mother rushes out to tell the good news. However, the spirit of Amara appears once more and the two fight, resulting in Ella getting mortally wounded. As Amara tells Ella that her friends are waiting for her, Ella uses her strength to condemn Amara back to hell by placing a rosary around her neck. As Amara screams and vanishes, Ella collapses unconsciously to the floor. The camera pans up to her as she opens her eyes once more and the screen cuts to black.

Cast

Main
 Janella Salvador as ella Jimenez
 Marlo Mortel as Adrian Ular
 Jerome Ponce as Jacob Hanilar

Supporting
 Janice de Belen as Miss Gonzales
 Iza Calzado as Donya Amara Lobregat
 Dominic Ochoa as Father Anthony
 Sharlene San Pedro as Faye Zobela
 Ingrid dela Paz as Megan Fabregas
 Devon Seron as Allison Alcantara
 Eliza Pineda as Jessie Mendoza
 Phytos Ramirez as Jack Olivares
 Paolo Gumabao as Steve Balez

Guest
 Iza Calzado as Doña Amara Lobregat
 LJ Reyes as Veronica Lobregat
 Joem Bascon as Jaime
 Lilet as Elly
 Allan Paule as Ella's father
 Vangie Labalan as Manang Selya
 Sue Prado as Miss Taas
 Archie Adamos as Mang Anding
 Mara Lopez as Teacher

Production

The script for the film, originally entitled Rest House, took five years to perfect. According to Lily Monteverde, Regal Entertainment decided to enter the film for the 2015 Metro Manila Film Festival instead of another installment of the Shake, Rattle & Roll series. The budget that would have been allotted for a Shake, Rattle & Roll film was allotted for Haunted Mansion instead. All requests of director Jun Lana were granted by Regal and the production design was deemed very expensive by Monteverde. Monteverde said that the film has the biggest budget among the horror entries at the 2015 Metro Manila Film Festival.

Filming
Principal photography for the film began as early as April 2015. Director Jun Lana, said that the film is not rushed so it may be improved. The film was shot in Cabuyao, Laguna in Marcos Twin Mansion owned by the Marcoses.

The house was made to look older for the film while the venue was made to look brand-new for the flashback scenes set in the 1950s. A hole as big as a swimming pool was dug for a two-minute scene.
Additional shooting days were made for the final touch ups.

Creepy experiences on the set

Paolo Gumabao, who plays the character Steve in the movie, shared during the press conference that he, his stylist, and his personal assistant (PA) were "ghost hunting" on the second floor of the mansion on a break from filming. He and his stylist went into a room, only to have the door close behind them –there was no wind and his PA was at the opposite end of the hallway outside. Actress Ingrid dela Paz said she, Sharlene San Pedro, and Eliza Pineda, all heard a little boy talking on the second floor too.
Meanwhile, after the press conference, Janella told reporters that her mother and brother were inside a tent when they heard an old man moaning .

Release
The film was released on December 25, 2015, under Regal Entertainment as an official entry to the Metro Manila Film Festival. The film had a special screening at Greenhills Theatre Mall on December 18.

Marketing
On October 25, 2015 Regal Films released the first teaser trailer of the film. It was followed by the first official trailer of the film which was released on November 26. Another trailer was released by Regal Films on December 14 to promote the film.

Reception

Box office
The film opened in more than 40 cinemas and earned  in its first day of showing.The film landed on 3rd spot on its opening day.

Critical reception

Special screening
Haunted Mansion received positive reviews during its special screening at Greenhills Theatre Mall on December 18, 2015.

A review from jobonsol.net that "I had to close my eyes because it is really scary".

Official release
Haunted Mansion received generally positive reviews from film critics. The film was praised for its cinematography and special effects, Lana's direction was given praises too.The cast was praised for its good performances in the film as well.

A film critic from Ely's Planet gave a rating of 7/10 saying,"DESPITE SOME WEAK points, Haunted Mansion is a breath of fresh air to Metro Manila Film Festival (MMFF) as it takes the audience to various shocking surprises in the course of around two hours."

Starmometer also gave a positive review stating that, "The film succeeds in building up tension and keeping the story from being predictable. The technical aspects are very strong from sounds to cinematography, and from make-up to production design. The lighting and the location itself create a pretty decent horror experience. The main cast, on the other hand, is all right. The standout in the cast, however, is Iza Calzado who established a scary presence in the second half of the film." Starmometer gave a rating 8.5/10.

Oggs Cruz from Rappler says that in spite of the familiarity of the premise and title, "'Haunted Mansion' is something else." He even added that " Carlo Mendoza’s cinematography is wonderfully precise, lending credibility to the atmosphere that Lana seeks to create. Mendoza knows how to use both light and shadows to evoke a certain sense of unease. The film’s maturely constructed imagery is assisted by a sound design that does not rely on noise and glaring orchestrations to scare. While Lana still employs shock tactics to keep the film’s audience at the edge of their seats, the film is nevertheless deliberate in its pacing. It creeps meaningfully, initially concentrating on the banal concerns of its characters before thrusting its purpose of betraying innocent beliefs with a climax that haphazardly has the lives of all the characters, whether they are good or bad, endangered with explicit savagery."

Accolades

See also
 List of ghost films

References

External links
 

2015 films
Philippine haunted house films
Philippine ghost films
Philippine supernatural horror films
Philippine teen horror films
Films shot in Laguna (province)
Films set in country houses
Regal Entertainment films
2015 horror films
Philippine horror films
Films directed by Jun Robles Lana